Tim Cohane (born May 22, 1942) is a highly decorated Vietnam veteran, American college basketball coach, Wall Street entrepreneur and sports lawyer.

Early life
Cohane played basketball at Archbishop Stepinac High School in White Plains, New York where he won a Catholic High School Athletic Association championship in 1960. After high school, Cohane enrolled at College of the Holy Cross but was expelled as a freshman for his role in a panty raid. After his expulsion, Cohane enrolled at the U.S. Naval Academy and played for that school's basketball team. After graduating, Cohane volunteered for duty in Vietnam on the rivers of the Mekong Delta. For his service, he was awarded two Bronze Stars, a Purple Heart and a dozen other commendations. After a year in Vietnam, Cohane was stationed in Naval Station Newport in Rhode Island where he coached a basketball team on-base.

Coaching career
After leaving the service, Cohane spent four years at Iona Preparatory School in New Rochelle, New York where he taught history and coached the boys' basketball team. Cohane was then hired by Manhattanville College which had recently begun accepting male students; he became the first coach of the school's men's basketball team. He led Manhattanville to consecutive appearances in the NCAA Division III men's basketball tournament in his final two seasons with the program.

Cohane was hired away from Manhattanville by Dartmouth College where he admitted he "alienated half the administration" by complaining about recruiting problems. He resigned from the Dartmouth job shortly after the end of the 1982–83 season, his fifth with the school.

After leaving Dartmouth, Cohane was introduced to the trading floor of New York Stock Exchange by a friend. Cohane was hired by Salomon Brothers but later met and befriended Larry Rafferty and began working for Rafferty Securities. While working on Wall Street, he was hired to fill the coaching vacancy at the U.S. Merchant Marine Academy. He spent two seasons as the unpaid head coach of the Mariners.

Between his first three college head coaching jobs and his stint at the University at Buffalo, Cohane compiled an overall record of 223–236. Cohane resigned as head coach at Buffalo five games into the 1999–2000 season, as a result of an NCAA investigation in which he was alleged to have violated NCAA rules. He was replaced by Reggie Witherspoon as head coach of the Bulls. In 2004, Cohane filed a long-running lawsuit against the NCAA, the University at Buffalo, and the Mid-American Conference, accusing them of conspiring to remove him as coach. Among other things, Cohane alleged that the NCAA knew UB officials coerced players into implicating him; he claimed that UB officials threatened to strip Bulls players of their eligibility and block seniors from graduating unless they corroborated claims of violations by Cohane. On May 15, 2015, the United States Court of Appeals for the Second Circuit ruled in favor of the NCAA in the case. Cohane is also a 2005 graduate of the Roger Williams University School of Law, and has developed a law practice specializing in assuring due-process and related protections to coaches and student-athletes alike.

Head coaching record

References

Place of birth missing (living people)
1943 births
Living people
United States Navy personnel of the Vietnam War
Buffalo Bulls men's basketball coaches
Dartmouth Big Green men's basketball coaches
Manhattanville Valiants men's basketball coaches
Merchant Marine Mariners men's basketball coaches
Navy Midshipmen men's basketball players
Roger Williams Hawks men's basketball coaches
Roger Williams University alumni
United States Naval Academy alumni
American men's basketball players